Ferdinand Lleshi (born 1956) is an Albanian footballer. He played in eight matches for the Albania national football team from 1976 to 1981.

References

External links
 

1956 births
Living people
Albanian footballers
Albania international footballers
Place of birth missing (living people)
Association footballers not categorized by position